Pokémon: Diamond and Pearl: Sinnoh League Victors (advertised as Pokémon: DP Sinnoh League Victors), is the thirteenth season of the Pokémon animated series and the fourth and final season of Pokémon the Series: Diamond and Pearl, known in Japan as . It originally aired in Japan from January 7, 2010, to February 3, 2011, on TV Tokyo and in the United States from June 5, 2010, to February 5, 2011, on Cartoon Network, concluding the final adventures of series protagonist Ash Ketchum as he continues to travel with Dawn, Pikachu and Brock in the Sinnoh region.



Episode list

Music 
The Japanese opening songs are "The Greatest - Everyday!" (サイコー・エブリディ!, Saikō - Eburidei!) by Fumie Akiyoshi for 25 episodes, and "The Greatest - Everyday! (BAND VERSION)" (サイコー・エブリディ! BAND VERSION, Saikō - Eburidei! BAND VERSION) by Fumie Akiyoshi with THE GREATEST BAND for 11 episodes. The ending songs are "Which One 〜 Is It?" (ドッチ〜ニョ？, Dotchi〜Nyo?) by MooMoo Milk and Araki-san for 25 episodes, "In Your Heart, LaLaLa" (君の胸にＬａＬａＬａ, Kimi no Mune Ni LaLaLa) by MADOKA for 11 episodes, and the English opening song is "We Will Carry On!" by Adam Elk. Its instrumental version serves as the ending theme.

Home media releases 
Viz Media and Warner Home Video released the entire series in three DVD box sets in the United States in 2012.

Viz Media and Warner Home Video released Pokémon the Series Diamond and Pearl: Sinnoh League Victors – The Complete Season on DVD on February 23, 2021.

Notes

References

External links 
 
  at Cartoon Network
  at TV Tokyo 
  at TV Tokyo 
 
  at Pokémon JP official website 
 

2010 Japanese television seasons
Season13